The BDe 4/4 II were electric multiple units ("EMUs") especially built in the 1950s for the CFF line La-Plaine - Geneva. The line is electrified, not to Swiss standard, but to the Southern French 1.5 kV DC standard, so standard rolling stock could not be used.

History
The two special EMUs were delivered in 1956 and 1957 as BFe 4/4 II class numbers 881 and 882. In 1961 they were renumbered 1301 and 1302 and in 1963 reclassified to BDe 4/4 II.  They ran in three car trainsets with a light steel carriage and a driving car.

The BDE 4/4 IIs were underpowered, so broke down frequently and were often in the workshop under repair.  To maintain the service, the CFF had to use unusual solutions including diesel haulage.  Due to extensive electrification, the CFF does not possess many diesel locos. The first choice was  Am 4/4, (former V 200 class) but these too were unreliable forcing the occasional use of diesel Em 3/3 or quadruple voltage electric Ee 3/3IV shunting locomotives.  None of these locomotives permitted train heating which was a problem in winter.  In 1977, a light steel coach  (B 50 85 29-30 503) was fitted with a pantograph and switchgear to solve the problem.

In 1995 the la Plaine - Geneva service was upgraded and branded Rhône Express Régional.   After nearly 40 years of service, the venerable BDe 4/4 II were retired and replaced with new rolling stock.

Multiple units of Switzerland